R (on the application of Pitt and Tyas) v General Pharmaceutical Council was a 2017 decision of the High Court of Justice in its Queen's Bench Division.

In 2017, the  General Pharmaceutical Council (GPhC) renamed its “Standards of Conduct, Ethics and Performance”, which set standards for those it regulates, to “Standards for Pharmacy Professionals”. At the same time, it changed the standards to include for the first time the express provision that “The standards need to be met at all times, not only during working hours.” Two pharmacists, Pitt and Tyas, who were employees of the Pharmacists’ Defence Association, initiated judicial review proceedings on the basis that – they alleged - the standards infringed their human rights as set out in Articles 8 (the right to private and family life), 10 (freedom of expression) and 11 (freedom of association) of the European Convention on Human Rights, and as given effect in UK law through Sch. 1 to the Human Rights Act 1998. The challenge was not successful.

Alongside the implications for pharmacists, the judgement may have significant implications relating to the extent to which regulators may in the future impose requirements on the private lives of members of regulated professions and occupations. It provides commentary on the extent to which it is possible - if at all - to separate professional/working life from personal life.

Potential issues with the judgement

No power at law to set standards applying at all times
 In relation to the GPhC's powers at law, the judgement did not distinguish between the GPhC's power in Article 51(4)(b) of the Pharmacy Order 2010 to consider a person's fitness to practise impaired by reason of matters arising at any time, and a power to set standards applying at all times (the GPhC has no such express power in law). However, at paragraph 39, the judgement appears to attach significance to Article 51(4)(b) as a basis for concluding that the GPhC had not exceeded its powers in setting standards which apply at all times.

Behaviour arising at any time vs standards applying at all times
 As regards the impact on pharmacists’ private and family lives (and as such their human rights), the judgement did not draw a distinction between behaviour arising at any time which may undermine public confidence in pharmacists (due to its nature or the circumstances, assessed in the context of whether it infringes the standards), and the entire content of the standards being required to be met at all times, including in pharmacists’ private lives.

Standards to relate to the practice of pharmacy at registered pharmacies
 A notable aspect of the provision in Article 4(3) of the Pharmacy Order 2010 (cited at paragraph 10 of the judgement), which sets out the GPhC's principal functions in setting standards, is that the standards are to be “for the safe and effective practice of pharmacy at registered pharmacies”. On this basis, by setting standards applying at all times, the GPhC arguably exceeded the scope of its functions as a regulator.

Examples may not relate to pharmacy practice
 Some of the examples in the standards, such as “overcome barriers to communication”  and “check the person has understood the information they have been given” – even if breached during a pharmacist's private life – would seem highly unlikely (or perhaps even incapable) of being relevant to the practice of pharmacy at a registered pharmacy. Requiring the standards to be met at all times, then, arguably imposes a burdensome requirement on a pharmacist's life beyond the practice of pharmacy.

Examples are expected behaviours
 At paragraph 37 of the judgement, the judge may potentially have misinterpreted the “examples” to the standards as optional behaviours. Rather, they appear to be phrased as a non-exhaustive list of behaviours expected at all times. The judgement states that “As the Standards themselves make clear, the examples given are just that. They are intended to be helpful to illustrate what may or may not be appropriate conduct.” However, the examples are prefaced with “There are a number of ways to meet this standard and below are examples of attitudes and behaviours expected”.  As such, it may appear that on the proper reading of the examples, they constitute a list of behaviours the GPhC expects to be met; they are examples among others, in that there may be other behaviours in addition to those listed which apply in some cases, but those listed are expected nonetheless. There may be different ways to meet the standards - for example different ways of being polite and considerate, in different contexts, or by going beyond the expected behaviours provided in the list of examples, but it is difficult to see how a list of expected attitudes and behaviours could be interpreted as optional. The examples are also prefaced with “People receive safe and effective care when [pharmacists]:” Seemingly, safe and effective care can only be delivered when pharmacists do the things listed in the examples at all times, further suggesting that they are not optional behaviours – but instead are expected and required. The use of the word “people” instead of “patients” here also indicates that the standards set expectations of pharmacists to provide care to all people generally - a further indication that the examples are intended to apply beyond the practice of pharmacy.
 Without the accompanying examples, the standards would have very little content. This may further suggest that the examples provided in the document are not merely a list of optional behaviours – ways to meet the standards if the pharmacist chooses to follow them - but rather, are expected behaviours and part of the standards themselves. 
 The standards state that “The examples may not apply in all situations.”  This is not the same as saying that they do not apply at all times, or wherever relevant. For example, if a pharmacist is alone, he or she may have nobody to whom he or she needs be polite and considerate. So, the example may not be relevant at that time. However, if he or she meets another person, then the requirement to be polite and considerate arises.
 It may not be possible to separate the examples from the “standards”. The whole document in which the examples appear is called “Standards for Pharmacy Professionals” and the examples appear under each individual numbered heading, of which there are nine. If the examples were truly advisory – different in effect and meaning to the numbered headings (which one could call the “standards”) – then the examples could have been published in a separate guidance document. The fact that they were not suggests that the examples form part of the standards.
 Even if the argument could somehow be successfully made that the examples to the numbered headings do not have to be met at all times, that they are indeed separable from the numbered headings and that it is the numbered headings which constitute the standards, the numbered headings themselves would need to be met at all times, according to the provisions in the document. Given their broad drafting, for example [Pharmacists must] “communicate effectively” and “work in partnership with others”, this arguably imposes a burdensome requirement on pharmacists’ private lives in any event.

Common sense, pharmacists and lawyers
 The judge concluded that the standards “need to be interpreted in a way which is rooted in real life and common sense. This is not least because they are intended to guide the conduct of pharmacy professionals in a practical way; they are not addressed primarily to lawyers.” However, “common sense” is a notoriously difficult concept. The judgement did not define what it meant, nor whose sense was common. Nor did it acknowledge that a “real life” interpretation of the standards may involve one made by any member of the public, or employer, and that the one made by the applicants was that the standards infringed their human rights. It also did not say what the difference would be if the standards were interpreted by lawyers, as opposed to “in a practical way”, or acknowledge that in cases where the standards are required to be interpreted – for example, when a pharmacist's fitness to practise is called into question – it would be lawyers who are interpreting them. The judgement did not explain why pharmacists should make do with text which is any less clear than that a lawyer would read, or how a lawyer is supposed to read it in the event of a legal challenge.

Context in which pharmacists work
 The judgement did not address the context in which many pharmacists work – in large multinational companies or NHS trusts with extensive in-house legal teams - and the difficulties pharmacists may face in arguing their own interpretation of the standards as against that of an organisation's lawyers, should a dispute arise.

Behaviour in private life may not reflect on the pharmacy profession
 The standards state: "The standards need to be met at all times, not only during working hours. This is because the attitudes and behaviours of professionals outside of work can affect the trust and confidence of patients and the public in [pharmacists]." Standard 6 is particularly clear in relation to the GPhC's expectations: “People expect [pharmacists] to behave professionally. This is essential to maintaining trust and confidence in pharmacy. Behaving professionally is not limited to the working day, or face-to-face interactions. The privilege of being a [pharmacist], and the importance of maintaining confidence in the [profession] [calls] for appropriate behaviour at all times.”  The judgement did not address the fact that a person may not be known, to the people with whom he or she is interacting, to be a pharmacist, in many of the social situations in which he or she may find himself / herself. As such, it is unlikely that such behaviour would reflect badly on the pharmacy profession, and yet the standards would still apply to that behaviour.

Are the applicants victims?
 In assessing whether the applicants were “victims” (and therefore able to rely on their rights under the European Convention on Human Rights) the judgement may not have attached sufficient weight to the effect of the standards in modulating pharmacists’ behaviours during their private lives. Instead, at paragraph 62 the judgement focuses on the fact that an event occurring at any time (including during private life) could raise questions about a pharmacist's fitness to practise. The applicants were in agreement on this point; this was not the point with which they were taking issue. The judgement states at paragraph 62 that “an assessment of the proportionality of any interference… is an exercise which cannot be done in advance and in the abstract. It requires examination of the concrete facts of a particular case.” The fundamental point being argued by the applicants, however, was that the need to comply with the standards at all times would arguably be oppressive, modulate a pharmacist's behaviour in his/her private life to meet all aspects of the standards (and not, say, merely to the extent that trust and confidence in the profession would not be diminished) and unduly restrict his/her expression and association. That in itself, the applicants contended, was the interference, the proportionality of which could have been assessed. It was not an interference which would only occur in the future in the event of the pharmacist's behaviour being called into question, so would not have needed assessing “in advance”; it is one which would take effect as soon as the standards took effect.
 The potential for unduly modulating behaviour is perhaps illustrated by the example to one of the standards - “[be] polite and considerate”. Depending on the circumstances, if breached in a pharmacist's private life, this could undermine public confidence in pharmacists. However, it is not difficult to envisage circumstances in which a pharmacist may not be “polite” or “considerate” in his/her private life, the effect of which would have no bearing on his/her practice of pharmacy (for example, if subjected to a physical assault, or when swearing among friends). Applying this example at all times could therefore potentially place undue restrictions on pharmacists’ private lives.

Precedent in other professional codes of conduct
 There is precedent for codes of conduct, for example the Bar Standard's Board's (BSB's) code of conduct (which would have applied to the judge, as a barrister) making the distinction between duties, rules and guidance which apply at all times and those which do not. In the BSB Code of Conduct, for example, CD5 (You must not behave in a way which is likely to diminish the trust and confidence which the public places in you or in the profession) and CD9 (You must be open and co-operative with your regulators) are expressly said to apply at all times. It is also notable that these duties relate directly to the practice of the profession. Other core duties are not said expressly to apply at all times, in the code.

References

United Kingdom case law
2017 in case law
2017 in British law